James Caldwell Prestwich (1852–1940) was an English architect. He was born in Atherton, Lancashire and educated at Leigh and Nantwich Grammar Schools. He trained to be an architect in London and returned to Leigh in 1875 to start an architectural practice which he worked in until 1930 and which was continued by his son.  He produced many buildings in Leigh and Nicholas Pevsner remarked that, "Any building of any merit (in Leigh) which is not a church or a mill is almost certainly by the local firm of J.C. Prestwich & Sons, capable – sometimes very capable – in a number of styles."

Several of Prestwich's buildings survive including the Central Buildings on Bradshawgate which were built for the Leigh Friendly Co-operative Society, Leigh Cenotaph, Leigh Technical School and Library on Railway Road,  Leigh Town Hall, Leigh Infirmary and numerous  shop, public house and business premises and houses  in Pennington. Other buildings have been demolished including Leigh Public Baths and Leigh Union workhouse hospital. Prestwich designed other public buildings including Tyldesley Library and Atherton Town Hall. Further afield he designed public baths in Stockport, Ashton-in-Makerfield and Northampton and schools in Atherton, Southport, Birkdale and Hindley.

Prestwich was a fellow of the Manchester Society of Architects and practised until 1930. His son Harold joined the practice in 1908.

References
Notes

Bibliography

 

   

Architects from Greater Manchester
People from Atherton, Greater Manchester
1852 births
1940 deaths